John Hamilton (19 January 1891 – 24 August 1964) was an Australian rules footballer who played with Fitzroy in the Victorian Football League (VFL).

Notes

External links 
		

1891 births
1964 deaths
Australian rules footballers from Victoria (Australia)
Fitzroy Football Club players